Coal is a sedimentary rock composed mainly of carbon and used as a fossil fuel.

Coal may also refer to:

Particular types of Coal 
 Anthracite
 Bituminous coal
 Lignite

Other combustible fuels
Charcoal, a similar solid carbon compound also used as a fuel source, frequently shortened to coal
Ember, a lump of solid fuel in a fire, also called a hot coal

Media
Coal (TV series), American reality show about coal miners
Coal (book), collection of poetry by Audre Lorde, published in 1976
Coal, a 2006 album by the indie rock band The Devastations
Coal (Leprous album)
Coal (Kathy Mattea album), 2008
Coal, the title of a children's story from the Railway Series book Henry the Green Engine by the Reverend Wilbert Awdry

Locations
Coal, Missouri
Coal, West Virginia
Coal County, Oklahoma
Coal City (disambiguation)
Coal Creek (disambiguation)
Coal Fork, West Virginia
Coal Harbor (disambiguation)
Coal Hill (disambiguation)
Coal Hollow (disambiguation)
Coal Island (disambiguation)
Coal Lake (disambiguation)
Coal Mountain (disambiguation)
Coal Ridge (disambiguation)
Coal River (disambiguation)
Coal Run (disambiguation)
Coal Township (disambiguation)
Coal Valley (disambiguation)
Coalmont (disambiguation)
Forks of Coal, West Virginia

Animals
Coal skink, a species of lizard
Coal tit, a passerine bird in the tit family Paridae

Other uses
Wande Coal (born 1985), Nigerian singer

See also

Chal (name)
Cole (disambiguation)
Col (disambiguation)
Kohl (disambiguation)